Peltigera gowardii, or western waterfan, is an aquatic lichen found only in mountain streams of Western North America. It is the largest aquatic lichen in the Pacific Northwest.

P. gowardii is currently listed as a species of Special Concern in Canada, as two of five known populations have been extirpated. In the United States, Montana and Alaska list this lichen as an S1 species, at high risk of extirpation, while Washington and California give it a slightly more secure ranking. Rising temperatures and habitat loss are the largest threat to the survival of P. gowardii.

Description 
P. gowardii is a tripartite lichen, consisting of fungus, alga, and Nostoc cyanobacteria. It has a gelatinous consistency due to living in aquatic or semi-aquatic locations, most often mountain streams or springs above  elevation. It grows in small rosettes attached to rock. It has a dark blue-green to black colour when above water, but becomes olive-green when submerged. It can be distinguished from algae or plants by the distinctive veins along the backside of the thallus, as well as round, brown apothecia present. These apothecia are the sexually reproductive parts of the lichen, and no vegetatively reproductive parts are seen.

P. gowardii is morphologically similar to P. hydrothyria. They are most easily differentiated by geography, with P. gowardii being a western species and P. hydrothyria mainly growing in the east. P. gowardii also has all chemical tests return negative, while P. hydrothyria tests positive for methylgyrophorate.

References

gowardii
Lichen species
Lichens of Western Canada
Lichens of the United States
Lichens described in 2011
Fungi without expected TNC conservation status
Lichens of Subarctic America